Peter dalle Carceri (died 1340) was a Triarch of Euboea and Baron of Arcadia. He was descended from the noble Dalle Carceri family, son of Grapozzo dalle Carceri and Beatrice of Verona, both Lords of Euboea.

According to a conjecture by Karl Hopf, he married first with a daughter from the first marriage of George I Ghisi, Lord of Tinos and Mykonos; however this hypothesis is rejected by Loenertz.

In 1324, Peter is attested as lord of half of the Barony of Arcadia in the Principality of Achaea, and it is usually assumed that this came about as a result of a second marriage to Balzana Gozzadini, the widow of Baron Erard II of Aulnay. Balzana died soon after.

He died in 1340 and he was succeeded by his son Giovanni, who was the only son of the second marriage.

References

Sources
 
 

1340 deaths
Triarchs of Negroponte
Peter
Medieval Euboeans
Year of birth unknown
14th-century Italian nobility
Peter